Before 1982, modifying the Constitution of Canada primarily meant amending the British North America Act, 1867. Unlike most other constitutions, however, the Act had no amending formula; instead, changes were enacted through Acts of the Parliament of the United Kingdom (or "Imperial Parliament") called the British North America Acts.

Other Commonwealth countries had taken over the authority for constitutional amendment after the Statute of Westminster 1931, but at the time, Canada decided to allow the Parliament of the United Kingdom to retain the power "temporarily." With the Constitution Act, 1982, Canada took over the authority to amend its own constitution, achieving full sovereignty.

Between 1931 and 1982, the federal government, on behalf of the House of Commons of Canada and the Senate, would issue an address to the British government requesting an amendment. The request would include a resolution containing the desired amendments, which in turn were always passed by the British Parliament with little or no debate.

Amendment formula 

As part of the patriation of the Constitution in 1982 an amending formula was adopted in sections 38 to 49 of the Constitution Act, 1982.

According this act, the amendment procedure is composed of different categories, depending on the part of the constitution to be amended.

Category 1: unanimous consent required 
There are some parts of the Constitution that can be modified only with the unanimous consent of all the provinces plus the two Houses of Parliament. This formula is contained in section 41 of the Constitution Act, 1982, and is known as the "unanimity formula". It is reserved for the following matters:

Category 2:  "7/50 formula" required 
For some constitutional provisions, amendments can be passed only if identical resolutions are adopted by the House of Commons, the Senate and two-thirds or more of the provincial legislative assemblies (i.e. at least seven) representing at least 50 per cent of the national population. This formula, which is outlined in section 38 of the Constitution Act, 1982, is officially referred to as the "general amendment procedure" and is known colloquially as the "7/50 formula". It is the amendment formula that applies when the amendment does not fall into any other category. 

Once the procedure for the adoption of the amendment is followed successfully, the amendment is formalized as a proclamation of the Governor General in Council. Officially, therefore, the Constitution is amended by Proclamation, and the issue of the Proclamation requires prior approval by resolutions of the House of Commons, the Senate, and the necessary number of provincial legislative assemblies.

The following matters are explicitly reserved to the "7/50 formula", by virtue of s. 42:

Category 3: Provisions applying to one or more, but not all, provinces 
According to s. 43, any amendment applying to one or more, but not all, provinces must be "authorized by resolution of the Senate and House of Commons and of the legislative assembly of each province to which the amendment applies."

If a constitutional amendment affects only one province, only the assent of the two houses of Parliament and of that province's legislative assembly is required. Seven of the eleven amendments passed so far have been of this nature, four being passed by and for Newfoundland and Labrador, one for New Brunswick, one for Prince Edward Island, and one for Quebec.  This formula is contained in section 43 of the Constitution Act, 1982.

Category 4: Provisions concerning federal institutions 
According to s. 44, constitutional provisions concerning federal institutions (executive government of Canada, Senate, and House of Commons) can be amended unilaterally by the Parliament of Canada if the provisions are not those explicitly reserved for unanimity or 7/50 formula. For example, in 2022, the Canadian government used this amendment method to modify the House of Commons seat allocation formula to prevent Quebec from losing a seat when its population grows slower than other provinces.

Category 5: Provincial Constitution 
According to s. 45, each province has the exclusive power to modify its own constitution, if the changes do not concern matters outlined in s. 41.  This section has been the subject of much confusion and debate, since some provincial constitutions are embedded in the same documents that form the constitution of Canada.

No specific mention is made in the procedure for amendments affecting what falls within the federal/provincial distribution of powers. Therefore, they can be dealt with generally under s. 38, or with respect to specific provinces under s. 43. However, a s. 38 amendment in that regard will not apply to a province that has passed a resolution of dissent from it, and s. 40 states that a s. 38 amendment that transfers provincial jurisdiction over an education or cultural matter to Parliament must be accompanied by reasonable compensation by Canada to the provinces.

Supreme Court of Canada in the amending formula

There has been a debate among legal scholars as to whether the Supreme Court of Canada is entrenched in the Constitution of Canada. The Supreme Court of Canada was not created by the constitution, rather the power to create a "Court of General Appeal for Canada" was granted to Parliament by s. 101 of the British North America Act, 1867.  Parliament proceeded to create the Supreme Court of Canada under the authority of s. 101 in 1875 by passing the Supreme Court Act, which was an ordinary piece of legislation with no constitutional significance at the time.

The Supreme Court of Canada was mentioned for the first time in a constitutional document by the Constitution Act, 1982. The Supreme Court is referred to twice.  First, s. 41 lists several amendments to the Constitution of Canada requiring unanimous consent. S. 41(d) includes the "composition of the Supreme Court of Canada" in this list.  Second, s. 42(1) lists several amendments to the Constitution of Canada requiring the general amendment procedure. S. 42(1)(d) includes "subject to s. 41(d), the Supreme Court of Canada" in this list. Sections 41 and 42 of the Constitution Act, 1982, thus appear to include the Supreme Court of Canada in the Constitution of Canada.  However, this conclusion is questionable because the "Constitution of Canada" is expressly defined in s. 52(2) as a set of thirty instruments that does not include the Supreme Court Act. Some scholars, including Peter Hogg, have suggested that the references to the Supreme Court of Canada in sections 41 and 42 are ineffective.  They argue that these references are "anticipatory" and will become effective only if Parliament adds the Supreme Court Act to the list in s. 52(2). Other scholars, including Professor Cheffins, have argued that the Supreme Court Act is implied as entrenched into s. 52(2) because of sections 41 and 42.  S. 52(2) uses the words "includes ..." to introduce the list of thirty instruments, suggesting that the provision does not contain an exhaustive list. The Supreme Court itself has confirmed in New Brunswick Broadcasting Co. v. Nova Scotia (Speaker of the House of Assembly), [1993] 1 S.C.R. 319 that s. 52(2) is not exhaustive, but has not yet ruled on whether the Supreme Court Act is included in the Constitution of Canada.

In Reference re Supreme Court Act, ss. 5 and 6 2014 SCC 21, a majority of the Supreme Court ruled that clauses concerning the appointment of Justices from Quebec are entrenched.

Debate 

Amending the Canadian Constitution is a topic of great debate in Canada. There seems to be general agreement among provincial governments that some parts of the Constitution need to be amended to deal with long-standing demands from many provinces.  There are demands by western provinces for a greater share of power at the federal level, and demands from Quebec for greater protection for its status as a distinct society.  Quebec, in particular, has not formally agreed to the Constitution Act, 1982, although this does not affect the legal applicability of the Act.

Nevertheless, agreement on details of amendments has been elusive. Further complicating attempts to amend the Constitution is the complexity of the procedure for doing so, which in most cases requires approval from both the federal government and two-thirds of the provincial governments representing at least 50 per cent of the population, and in some cases require the approval of the federal government and all ten provincial governments.

The 1987 Meech Lake Accord, a package of constitutional amendments, intended to address Quebec's objections to the Constitution Act, 1982, failed in 1990 when it was not ratified by all ten provincial governments. The last attempt at a comprehensive package of constitutional amendments was the Charlottetown Accord, which arose out of the failure of the Meech Lake Accord. The Charlottetown Accord was defeated in a national referendum in 1992.

There have been several amendments to the Constitution since it was patriated in 1982 including amendments dealing with provincial schooling in Newfoundland and Quebec and the changing of the name of Newfoundland to Newfoundland and Labrador (see below).

Although the amending formula has not been formally altered, the Canadian government under Prime Minister Jean Chrétien after the 1995 Quebec referendum recognized regional vetoes over proposed amendments, held by the provinces of Ontario, Quebec and British Columbia, and by the regions the Prairies (Alberta, Saskatchewan and Manitoba) and the Atlantic (New Brunswick, Nova Scotia, Newfoundland and Labrador, and Prince Edward Island).

Pre-1982 amendments to the Constitution
A majority of the constitutional amendments before 1982 were acts of the United Kingdom or Canadian parliaments to amend the British North America Act, 1867 (now the Constitution Act, 1867). In some cases, amendments were made to the constitutional structure of Canada by adding entire extra documents to the Constitution. These include orders that added provinces to Canada, such as the British Columbia Terms of Union and documents that altered the structure of the government of Canada, such as the Parliament of Canada Act, 1875.

Post-1982 amendments to the Constitution

Amending the Constitution has been a topic of much debate in contemporary Canada, and the two most comprehensive attempts to revise the document have both been defeated. There have, however, been thirteen amendments to the Constitution since it was amended in 1982. Most of these amendments have been limited in scope, dealing only with matters affecting specific provinces.

Post-1982 failed attempts 

Attempts to enact major amendments:
The Meech Lake Accord.
The Charlottetown Accord.

Ambiguous cases
There was debate about whether the Succession to the Throne Act, 2013, a federal statute, was a constitutional amendment that should have been passed under the constitutional amending formula requiring unanimous provincial consent. The Canadian Parliament passed the act to give its assent to the Succession to the Crown Bill (then still under debate in the Parliament of the United Kingdom), which aimed to remove male preference in the line of succession to Britain's throne, consistent with the Perth Agreement of the Commonwealth realms. Two professors of law from the Université Laval, Geneviève Motard and Patrick Taillon, began a law suit in the Quebec courts, arguing that the amendment should have been enacted using the unanimous amending formula under section 41. The Superior Court of Quebec and the Quebec Court of Appeal both rejected the claim, holding that according to the Statute of Westminster, 1931, a constitutional amendment is not required to match Canada's rules of succession to those of the United Kingdom. The Supreme Court of Canada denied leave to appeal.

Another ambiguous case is a 2021 act of the Quebec Legislature titled An Act respecting French, the official and common language of Quebec, which was largely amendments to the Charter of the French Language. The act purports to add sections 90Q.1 and 90Q.2 to the Constitution Act, 1867, which provide that Quebecers form a nation and that French is the only official language of Quebec. The act does not state which amending formula is used, but since the federal House of Commons did not authorize the bill, it would only have effect if it were an amendment to the Constitution of Quebec made by the section 45 amending process. Constitutional scholars are divided on the validity of an amendment to a provincial constitution framed as an addition to part of the Constitution of Canada.

Similarly, legislation passed by the Parliament of Quebec in 2022 (Bill 4) pertaining to section 128 of the Constitution Act, 1867 purports to alleviate members of Quebec's legislative assembly from the required oath. Constitutional scholars are divided on the validity of this enactment for similar reasons to the disagreement concerning An Act respecting French...

List of post-1982 amendments

Temporary alternative to amendment
Various provisions of the Canadian Constitution are subject to the notwithstanding clause, which is Section Thirty-three of the Canadian Charter of Rights and Freedoms.  This section authorizes federal and provincial parliaments to temporarily override the rights and freedoms in sections 2 and 7–15 for up to five years, subject to renewal. The federal parliament has never invoked it, although provincial parliaments have done so.

The notwithstanding clause was invoked routinely between 1982 and 1985 by the Parliament of Quebec, which did not support the enactment of the Charter but is subject to it nonetheless. The parliaments of Saskatchewan and Alberta have also previously invoked the notwithstanding clause, to end a strike and to protect an exclusively heterosexual definition of marriage, respectively. (Alberta's use of the notwithstanding clause was ultimately of no force or effect, since the definition of marriage is solely a federal jurisdiction and same-sex marriage was legalized nationwide with the Civil Marriage Act.) The territory of Yukon also passed legislation once that invoked the notwithstanding clause, but the legislation was never proclaimed in force. In 2018, Ontario's provincial government threatened to invoke the notwithstanding clause after legislation changing the size of Toronto's city council in the middle of a municipal election campaign period was ruled unconstitutional by the Ontario Superior Court of Justice. The threat was dropped after the Ontario Court of Appeal overturned the lower court decision, ruling that the change was "unfair" but still constitutional.

References 

Constitution of Canada
Canada